The Zmutt Glacier is a  long glacier (2005) situated in the Pennine Alps in the canton of Valais in Switzerland.

See also
List of glaciers in Switzerland
List of glaciers
Retreat of glaciers since 1850
Swiss Alps
Zmutt Valley

External links
Swiss glacier monitoring network

Glaciers of Valais